Turowski (feminine: Turowska, plural: Turowscy) is a Polish surname. It may refer to:
 Janusz Turowski (born 1961), Polish football coach
 Janusz Turowski (born 1927), Polish engineer
 Józef Turowski (died 1989), Polish military historian

Turovsky 
Turovsky, Turovska, Turovskaya are Ukrainian variants.
 Kirilo Turovskyy
 Genya Turovskaya, a Ukrainian-American poet
 JoAnn Turovsky, American harp teacher
 Mikhaylo Turovskyy, American-Ukrainian artist
 Roman Turovsky-Savchuk, Ukrainian-American composer

See also 
 Wólka Turowska, a village in the Gmina Grójec
 Turowicz
 Turów
 Turov
 Turaŭ (Turaw)

Polish-language surnames